Legong is a form of Balinese dance. It is a refined dance form characterized by intricate finger movements, complicated footwork, and expressive gestures and facial expressions.

Origins
Legong probably originated in the 19th century as royal entertainment. Legend has it that a prince of Sukawati fell ill and had a vivid dream in which two maidens danced to gamelan music. When he recovered, he arranged for such dances to be performed in reality. Others believe that the Legong originated with the sanghyang dedari, a ceremony involving voluntary possession of two little girls by beneficent spirits. Legong is also danced at public festivals. Excerpts from Legong dance dramas are put on for tourists.

Dancers

Traditionally, legong dancers were girls who have not yet reached puberty. They begin rigorous training from about the age of five. These dancers are regarded highly in the society and usually become wives of royal personages or wealthy merchants. After marriage they would stop dancing. However, in present Indonesia dancers may be of all ages; performances by men in women's costumes are also recorded.

Story
Classical Legong enacts several traditional stories. The most common is the tale of the East Javanese king of Lasem from the Malat, a collection of heroic romances. He is at war with another king, the father (or brother) of Princess Rangkesari. Lasem wants to marry the girl, but she detests him and tries to run away. Becoming lost in the forest, she is captured by Lasem, who imprisons her and goes out for a final assault against her family. He is attacked by a monstrous raven, which foretells his death.

The dramatics are enacted in elaborate and stylized pantomime. The two little actresses are accompanied by a third dancer called a condong or attendant. She sets the scene, presents the dancers with their fans and later plays the part of the raven.

Types
Traditionally, fifteen types of legong dance were known. The duration, movement, and narrative of each type differed. Some, for instance, could last for an hour. These types included:
 Legong Bapang Sabab
 Legong Jebog
 Legong Kraton
 Legong Kuntir
 Legong Lasem
 Legong Raja Cina
 Legong Semarandana
 Legong Sudasarna

Gallery

See also 

Balinese dances
 Legong: Dance of the Virgins, a 1935 film
 Dance of Indonesia

In popular culture
Legong is mentioned in "I've Been To Bali Too", the single by Australian folk-rock band Redgum from their 1984 album Frontline.

References

External links

Legong Keraton
Legong dance
Tari Legong Lasem part 1

Balinese culture
Dances of Bali